David Constantijn Saudale Airport , formerly known as Lekunik Airport, is an airport located in Rote Ndao Regency, East Nusa Tenggara, Indonesia. It serves Ba'a, the capital city of Rote Ndao Regency as well as the largest town in Rote Island. The airport serves as one of the main points of entry to Rote Island. Currently, the airport has a runway length of 1650 m × 30 m with a taxiway of 75 m × 17 m and aprons measuring 120 m × 85 m. The airport currently can only accommodate small aircraft such as the ATR-72. It has a 1,170 square meter passenger terminal and an operational building consisting of office buildings, NDB flight navigation building, workshop building, ATC tower, PKP-PK building and PH building. Wings Air is currently the only airline serving the airport, operating two daily flights to and from Kupang.

In the next few years, the airport will be developed again. The total land required for airport development is 64.60 hectares. Existing land currently only amounts to 51.40 hectares, so there are still 13.20 hectares that have not been cleared by the local government. The plan of this land will be used as a terminal parking and access road. To support the development of the airport, in 2018 the government has budgeted the cost of Rp. 49,160,428,000 to be used for runway smoothing, terminal interior renovation, drainage development, operational building construction, road upgrading and so on.

The airport is not currently operational

Airlines and destinations

Statistics

References 

Airports in East Nusa Tenggara
Rote Ndao Regency